
Deichmann or Deichman may refer to:

Deichmann

People
 Wilhelm Ludwig Deichmann (1798-1876), German banker
 Elisabeth Deichmann (1896-), Danish-American marine biologist
 Freya Deichmann (1911-2010), participant in the Kreisau Circle, an anti-Nazi resistance group
 Heinrich Deichmann (born 1962), German entrepreneur
 Johannes Pedersen Deichmann, Norwegian politician
 Paul Deichmann, German World War II Luftwaffe general and recipient of the Knight's Cross of the Iron Cross

Other uses
 Deichmann SE (formerly Heinrich Deichmann-Schuhe GmbH), the largest retailer of shoes and sportswear in Europe

Deichman 
 Deichman Library, a municipal public library serving Oslo, Norway
 Deichman Śląsk Wrocław, a football club from Wrocław, Poland